Rhacophorus verrucopus is a species of frog in the family Rhacophoridae, which is found in China and possibly India. Its natural habitats are subtropical or tropical moist lowland forests, subtropical or tropical moist montane forests, subtropical or tropical moist shrubland, and freshwater lakes.

References

verrucopus
Taxonomy articles created by Polbot
Amphibians described in 1983